Adam Richard M Berry (born 22 September 1992) is an Irish cricketer. He made his Twenty20 debut for Northern Knights in the 2017 Inter-Provincial Trophy on 11 August 2017.

References

External links
 

1992 births
Living people
Irish cricketers
Northern Knights cricketers
Place of birth missing (living people)